The Association for Supervision and Curriculum Development d/b/a ASCD is a membership-based non-profit organization founded in 1943. It has more than 125,000 members from more than 128 countries, including superintendents, principals, teachers, professors of education, and other educators. The ASCD Community also includes 52 affiliate organizations, self-organized Connected Communities, and ASCD Student Chapters. While ASCD was initially founded with a focus on curriculum and supervision, the association now provides its members with professional development, educational leadership, and capacity building. ASCD is a global community advancing student achievement by supporting the whole child, and seeks to develop programs, products, and services essential to the way educators learn, teach, and lead.

History and governance
ASCD formed when the National Education Association's Society for Curriculum Study and Department of Supervisors and Directors of Instruction merged in 1943. ASCD became totally independent of the NEA in 1972.

On July 1, 2015, Deborah Delisle became ASCD’s executive director and CEO. Delisle was Ohio's 35th state superintendent of public instruction, and a former Assistant Secretary for Elementary and Secondary Education at the U.S. Department of Education who was nominated by President Barack Obama and confirmed by the U.S. Senate on April 27, 2012.

ASCD is governed by a 10-member Board of Directors, which includes the association's executive director and is chaired by the association's president. A Leadership Council of elected and appointed ASCD members also provides guidance. Benjamin Shuldiner, the distinguished lecturer of education leadership at Hunter College, City University of New York, took office as ASCD’s current president in July, 2016.

Educational Leadership 
Educational Leadership (EL) magazine is ASCD's flagship publication, with a circulation of 135,000. EL provides information about teaching and learning, new ideas and practices relevant to practicing educators, and the latest trends and issues affecting prekindergarten through higher education. EL is published eight times each year, September through May, with a combined issue in December/January. EL also publishes a digital Summer issue that is free to the public.

Whole child initiative
In March 2007, ASCD launched its Whole Child Initiative to ensure all children are healthy, safe, engaged in learning, supported by caring adults, and academically challenged. The public-engagement and advocacy campaign encourages schools and communities to work together so that each student has access to a challenging curriculum in a healthy and supportive environment. ASCD contends that "current educational practice and policy focus overwhelmingly on academic achievement. This achievement, however, is but one element of student learning and development and only a part of any complete system of educational accountability."

Some experts like David Magnani, an education policy consultant, believe it could take significant effort to convince lawmakers of the need for the broader definition of achievement and accountability that the Whole Child Initiative promotes. Despite such concerns, the initiative has gained momentum and thousands of parents, educators, community leaders, and policymakers have sought more information from the initiative's website. In addition, dozens of partner organizations, such as the American School Health Association, Developmental Studies Center, and the National School Boards Association, have signed on in support of the initiative.

Programs, products, and services
ASCD has worked with a number of education experts to develop professional development programs, online courses, and publications to help educators learn, teach, and lead. Differentiated instruction, Understanding by Design, and What Works in Schools are the focus of much of its professional development offerings.

See also
 Understanding by Design
 Elizabeth Schmoke Randolph

References

External links

Educational organizations based in the United States
Organizations based in Alexandria, Virginia
Organizations established in 1943